The Sonorama Festival (since 2008 Sonorama-Ribera) is an annual music festival which takes place in the city of Aranda de Duero, in Castile and León (Spain), since 1998. It is organized by the cultural association, and non-profit, "Art de Troya", in mid-August each year. The line up mainly consists of indie pop, indie rock, and electronic music.

With a progressive growth, has become one of the biggest summer festivals in Spain, and it is broadcast live on Spanish National Radio: Radio 3. In 2010, it was awarded as the 3rd best Spanish festival by the readers of the magazine Rockdelux, as 4th best Spanish festival by magazine Mondosonoro. Also, it has been nominated for the Independent Music Awards, organized by the Unión Fonográfica Independiente, in the category of "Best Music Festival in Spain" in 2010 and in 2012.

The festival is also composed of other activities:

Sonorama Festival of Short Films, since 2000.
Music demo contest.
Visit and lunch in the old underground wineries of Aranda de Duero, with Ribera del Duero wine.
Wine tasting courses.
Tourist Route: Ruta del Vino (Wine´s Route).
Conferences.
Sonorama Kids, a show specially designed for children, since 2011.

During all its 14 editions, the festival has always had an international character, but mainly it is focused in the Spanish music scene. In its last edition, in 2011, more than 40,000 people attended during the 4 days long festival.

Sonorama´s influence on the Spanish music scene

Over the years the Festival Sonorama has become a launching point for Spanish indie pop groups. Although its stages have featured nearly all the big bands in the indie scene since it began, it has now chosen to opt for new names and emerging bands. In 2000 it already had names like Los Planetas and Digital 21. In 2001 and 2002 Deluxe and Ellos played. In 2003 Second and in 2005 The Sunday Drivers.

In 2007 concerts began in the historic centre of the city during the morning and since then the Plaza del Trigo stage has become, year after year, an emblematic scenario and unexpected witness to the confirmation of a group as an "indie" national band. This also happened in 2008 with Vetusta Morla, and most recently in 2010 with Supersubmarina.

But the festival is not only important as a driver for new talent, it is also known as a farewell venue for national groups. In 2005, the Catalan band Mercromina said goodbye at the Festival. On that occasion each national band that performed at the festival paid tribute to the band by playing at least one of their songs.

The festival does not only cater to indie rock and pop, sometimes accompanied by controversy, Sonorama has diversified into other styles and musical environments. From the singer-songwriter Bebe to the hip hop of La Mala Rodriguez to the electropop/hard rock of Dover. Even in 2007 Nacha Pop launched their comeback with a performance at Sonorama.

Bands who have played the festival in the past
During its 20 years several famous bands have performed at Sonorama, including: Mogwai, !!!, Ocean Colour Scene, OK Go, Yeah Yeah Yeahs, The Rentals, Asian Dub Foundation, Ash, Gogol Bordello, Nada Surf, Amy Macdonald, James, The Sounds, The Ettes, Brett Anderson, Molotov, Ecologist, Rinôçérôse, The Hidden Cameras, Los Campesinos!, Shout Out Louds, Teenage Fanclub, The Raveonettes, The Dandy Warhols, Kakkmaddafakka, The Primitives, Travis, Belle and Sebastian, Cut Copy, Mando Diao or The Hives.

Lineups

2008 Festival
Headliners Bands:

2009 Festival
Headliners Bands:

2010 Festival
Headliners Bands:

2011 Festival
During the 2011 edition, more than 100 bands performed and 40,000 people attended during the 4 days long festival, also a new activity just for children, "Sonorama Kids", was set up.

Headliners Bands:

2012 Festival 
Headliners Bands:
 Dates: 9, 10, 11, August 12.

Headliners Bands:

Sonorama 2013 
Headliners Bands:
 Dates: 14, 15, 16, August 17.

Headliners Bands:

Sonorama 2014 
Headliners Bands:
 Dates: August 13, 14, 15 & 16.

Headliners Bands:

Sonorama 2015 
Headliners Bands:
 Dates: mid-August (4 days)

Headliners Bands:

Sonorama 2016 
Headliners Bands:
 Dates: August 10–14 (5 days)

Headliners Bands:

Sonorama 2019 
Headliners Bands:
 Dates: August 7–11 (5 days)

Headliners Bands:

References

External links
 Festival Sonorama Ribera Official website.

Music festivals in Spain
Recurring events established in 1998
Electronic music festivals in Spain
Aranda de Duero